The 2017 FINA Swimming World Cup was a series of eight two-day meets in eight different cities between August and November 2017. This edition was held in the usual short-course (25 meter pool) format. Like the previous short course World Cup in 2016, 36 events were scheduled.

Meets

The 2017 World Cup consisted of the following eight meets, which were divided into three clusters. Eindhoven returned after having been omitted for the last two editions, while Paris and Dubai were dropped in comparison to the previous year. The other seven cities were the same as the previous year.

World Cup standings 

 Composition of points:
 Best performances (by meets): 1st place: 24 points, 2nd place: 18 points and 3rd place: 12 points;
 Points for medals (in individual events): gold medal: 12 points, silver medal: 9 points and bronze medal: 6 points;
 Bonus for world record (WR): 20 points.

Men

Women

Event winners

To limit the length of the program, each individual event was held in two meets in each cluster. The mixed relays were swum in each meet.

50 m freestyle

100 m freestyle

200 m freestyle

400 m freestyle

1500 m (men)/800 m (women) freestyle

50 m backstroke

100 m backstroke

200 m backstroke

50 m breaststroke

100 m breaststroke

200 m breaststroke

50 m butterfly

100 m butterfly

200 m butterfly

100 m individual medley

200 m individual medley

400 m individual medley

4 × 50 m mixed relays

Legend:

References

FINA Swimming World Cup
FINA Swimming World Cup